is a railway station on the Kintetsu Namba Line and Hanshin Namba Line in the Namba district of Chūō-ku, Osaka, Japan.  It is adjacent to Namba Station and JR Namba Station.  Trains of the Nara Line depart from and arrive at the station.

Lines
Ōsaka Namba Station is served by the following two lines.
 Kintetsu Namba Line
 Hanshin Namba Line

Station layout 
The station has an island platform and a side platform with three tracks on the third basement level, parallel to Namba Station on the Osaka Metro Sennichimae Line. There is a returning track in the west of the platforms between the two tracks of the Hanshin Namba Line.

Platforms

Adjacent stations

History
The station was first named  on March 15, 1970, when Kintetsu's Namba Line opened. It was renamed to the present name on March 20, 2009, the date of opening of the Hanshin Namba Line.

Surrounding area 
Kintetsu Namba Building
Midosuji Grand Building
Dōtonbori
Osaka City Air Terminal (OCAT)
Minatomachi River Place (including FM OSAKA)

References 

Chūō-ku, Osaka
Railway stations in Osaka
Stations of Kintetsu Railway
Stations of Hanshin Electric Railway